Pure Shores: The Very Best of All Saints is the second compilation album of the greatest hits of All Saints released on 27 September 2010. The 2-disc collection features the group's hit singles, (excluding "Under the Bridge") a collection of album tracks and their most stand-out B-sides, as well as a song by Melanie Blatt and Artful Dodger called "TwentyFourSeven".

Track listing
Disc 1
"Never Ever"
"Lady Marmalade"
"I Know Where It's At"
"I Remember"
"If You Don't Know What I Know"
"I Don't Wanna Be Alone"
"Rock Steady"
"Dreams"
"All Hooked Up"
"Alone"
"Surrender"
"War of Nerves" (98 remix)
"Love Is Love"
"Get Down"
"Inside"
"On and On"
"Lady Marmalade" (Timbaland remix)
"Ha Ha"

Disc 2
"Pure Shores"
"Black Coffee"
"Bootie Call"
"Let's Get Started"
"Chick Fit"
"I Feel You"
"No More Lies"
"Distance"
"Ready, Willing and Able"
"TwentyFourSeven" (Artful Dodger featuring Melanie Blatt)
"One More Tequila"
"Heaven"
"Saints and Sinners"
"Take the Key"
"Whoopin' Over You"
"Flashback"
"Pure Shores" (2 Da Beach U Don't Stop Remix)
"Black Coffee" (Neptunes remix)

Charts

References

2010 compilation albums
All Saints (group) compilation albums